The International Association of Financial Executives Institutes (IAFEI) is the premier global society of financial executives. Founded in 1969, it connects financial executives around the world with a global membership of more than 15,000 senior level finance executives, mainly chief financial officers across 18 national institutes. It is an international, non-profit and non-political professional association domiciled in Switzerland with its secretariat in the Philippines (Makati).

Aims 
IAFEI promotes networking opportunities for member institutes and their individual members, to build a wider understanding of financial practices throughout the world and the furtherance of their international compatibility and evolution, and the promotion of ethical considerations and best practices of financial management throughout the world.

IAFEI works to advance the finance profession through the activities of its technical working committees, through hosting and partnering with global, regional and national conferences, and through a number of expert publications including the IAFEI Quarterly, a digital journal of record.

The IAFEI World Congress is held annually since 1969. The congresses rotate among continents each year and are organized by the responsible national member institute on behalf of IAFEI. The 43rd IAFEI World Congress was held in conjunction with the 6th CFO Summit Emerging Europe & CIS in October 2013 in Warsaw. The 44th IAFEI World Congress was to be held in October 2014 in Manila, hosted by the Financial Executives Institute of the Philippines (FINEX).

Member institutes 
 ÖPWZ Forum Finanzen, Austria
 Financial Executives Institute of Belgium (FEIB), Belgium
 China Association of Chief Financial Officers (CACFO), China
 Financial Executives Institute of Chinese Taiwan (FEI Chinese Taiwan), Taiwan
 Association Nationale des Directeurs Financiers et de Contrôle de Gestion (DFCG), France
 Gesellschaft für Finanzwirtschaft in der Unternehmensführung e.V. (GEFIU), Germany
 Hellenic Institute of Financial Management of the Hellenic Management Association (HIFM),  Greece
 Indonesia Financial Executive Association (IFEA), Indonesia
 Israel Chief Financial Officers Forum, Israel
 Associazione Nazionale Direttori Amministrativi e Finanziari (ANDAF), Italy
 Japan Association for Chief Financial Officers (JACFO), Japan
 Korea Association for Chief Financial Officers (KCFO), South Korea
 Instituto Mexicano de Ejecutivos de Finanzas (IMEF), Mexico
 Financial Executives Institute of the Philippines (FINEX), Philippines
 FINEXA - Stowarzyszenie Dyrektorów Finansowych, Poland
 All-Russian Club of Financial Directors, Russia
 Asociación Espanola de Ejecutivos de Finanzas (AEEF), Spain
 Vietnam Chief Financial Officers Club (VCFO), Vietnam

Collaborative partnerships 
 Financial Executives International (FEI), USA
 Financial Executives International Canada (FEI), Canada

Members 
Members of IAFEI national institutes are mainly executives engaged in roles of financial policy making and control in leading businesses. They share a common interest in the techniques of financial management, financial accounting, reporting and maintaining business enterprises on a healthy basis in the face of changing business conditions. Membership of national institutes is typically open to financial executives or those performing policy setting functions in large and medium size companies, depending upon the national context and local institute bylaws. In many, but not all institutes, members may also include professionals and experts working in allied fields, such as audit and advisory services firms, financial services organizations, and scholars and academics.

IAFEI Technical Working Committees 
IAFEI's Technical Working Committees are composed of experts around the world engaged in sharing technical knowledge in key domains of interest to senior financial professionals. Among the global committees are:
 International Observatory of Management Control 
 International Tax Committee
 International Treasury Committee
 IFRS Committee

IAFEI officers and executive committee 
  Chairman: Luis Ortiz-Hidalgo (IMEF-Mexico)
  Vice Chairman: Fausto Cosi (ANDAF-Italy)
  Secretary: Victor Y. Lim Jr. (FINEX-Philippines)
  Treasurer: Emilio Pagani (ANDAF-Italy)
  Area President for the Americas: Juan Alfredo Ortega (IMEF-Mexico)
  Area President for Asia: Kenichi Ohta (JACFO-Japan)
  Area President Europe, Middle East & Africa: Armand Angeli (DFCG-France)
  Executive Director: Helmut Schnabel (GEFIU-Germany)

History 
The First International Congress of Financial Executives took place 1969 in Marbella, Spain and was hosted by the Spanish institute for finance executives (AEEF). At this event a new head organization for national institutes was created, with a legal situs in Switzerland. At the second world congress (Brussels in 1970), 55 representatives of 15 member institutes finalized the creation of the association. IAFEI was founded by the financial executives institutes of Argentina, Australia, Belgium, France, Germany, Italy, Mexico, Peru, Philippines, Spain, United Kingdom and the combined institutes of the United States of America and Canada (today: FEI - Financial Executives International), which played a key role.

IAFEI World Congress

The IAFEI World Congress is an annual congress organized on behalf of the IAFEI. The two to four day congress, which includes a gala dinner, is hosted by one of IAFEI's national member institutes. The congress, which is organized for corporate finance executives from all over the world, is normally held with the national convention of the hosting institute.

The first congress of international finance executives institutes was held in 1969 in Marbella, Spain. IAFEI World Congresses have since been held in 21 different countries. In the years 1975 and 2009, no congresses were organized.

Past congresses
 1st IAFEI World Congress, Marbella, Spain, 1969
 2nd IAFEI World Congress, Brussels, Belgium, 1970
 3rd IAFEI World Congress, Mexico City, Mexico, 1971
 4th IAFEI World Congress, Frankfurt am Main, Germany, 1972
 5th IAFEI World Congress, Paris, France, 1973
 6th IAFEI World Congress, Manila, Philippines, 1974
 7th IAFEI World Congress, Rio de Janeiro, Brazil, 1976
 8th IAFEI World Congress, Dublin, Ireland, 1977
 9th IAFEI World Congress, Buenos Aires, Argentina, 1978
 10th IAFEI World Congress, Atlanta, USA, 1979
 11th IAFEI World Congress, Sydney, Australia, 1980
 12th IAFEI World Congress, Mexico City, Mexico, 1981
 13th IAFEI World Congress, Madrid, Spain, 17–20 October 1982
 14th IAFEI World Congress, Jakarta, Indonesia, 31 October–November 2, 1983
 15th IAFEI World Congress, Venice, Italy, 30 September-3 October 1984
 16th IAFEI World Congress, Buenos Aires, Argentina, 17–20 November 1985
 17th IAFEI World Congress, Hong Kong, Hong Kong, 9–12 November 1986
 18th IAFEI World Congress, Caracas, Venezuela, 25–28 October 1987
 19th IAFEI World Congress, Manila, Philippines, 16–19 October 1988
 20th IAFEI World Congress, Paris, France, 26–29 September 1989
 21st IAFEI World Congress, Taipei, Taiwan, 5–7 November 1990
 22nd IAFEI World Congress, Cancun, Mexico, 21–23 November 1991
 23rd IAFEI World Congress, Madrid, Spain, 25–28 October 1992
 24th IAFEI World Congress, San Carlos de Bariloche, Argentina, 19–25 September 1993
 25th IAFEI World Congress, Washington D.C., USA, 2–5 October 1994
 26th IAFEI World Congress, Rome, Italy, 4–6 October 1995
 27th IAFEI World Congress, Jakarta/Bali, Indonesia, 30 October-1 November 1996
 28th IAFEI World Congress, Interlaken, Switzerland, 18–19 September 1997
 29th IAFEI World Congress, Rio de Janeiro, Brazil, 20–23 September 1998
 30th IAFEI World Congress, Vancouver, B.C., Canada, 26–28 May 1999
 31st IAFEI World Congress, Sydney, Australia, 8–11 October 2000
 32nd IAFEI World Congress, Cancun, Mexico, 17–21 October 2001
 33rd IAFEI World Congress, Madrid, Spain, 23–25 October 2002
 34th IAFEI World Congress, Florida, USA, 4–7 May 2003
 35th IAFEI World Congress, Florence, Italy, 11–13 October 2004
 36th IAFEI World Congress, Manila, Philippines, 4–7 November 2005
 37th IAFEI World Congress, Berlin, Germany, 8–11 October 2006
 38th IAFEI World Congress, Tokyo, Japan, 10–12 September 2007
 39th IAFEI World Congress, Paris, France, 15–17 December 2008
 40th IAFEI World Congress, Rome, Italy, 13–15 October 2010
 41st IAFEI World Congress, Beijing, China, 16–18 September 2011
 42nd IAFEI World Congress, Cancun, Mexico, 14–17 November 2012
 43rd IAFEI World Congress was held in conjunction with 6th CFO Summit Emerging Markets & CIS in Warsaw, Poland from 14–17 October 2013. The organizers on behalf of IAFEI were FINEXA - Stowarzyszenie Dyrektorów Finansowych and CFO Insight (a media brand by Frankfurt Business Media, Frankfurt).
 44th IAFEI World Congress, 15–17 October 2014 for the fourth time in Manila, Philippines. This was organized by the Financial Executives Institute of the Philippines (FINEX).

References

External links 

 

Business and finance professional associations
International professional associations
Organizations based in Manila